Yasynivka, also spelled Yasenivka, is a village in Dubno Raion, Rivne Oblast, Ukraine. If forms part of Semyduby rural hromada, one of the hromadas of Ukraine. In 2001, the village had 28 residents.

History 
In 1906, Yasynivka was a colony of the Sudobitsky volost, Dubensky district, Volyn province. The distance from the county town is 20 versts, and from the parish 20. It had 24 yards and inhabitants 155.
.

References 

Villages in Dubno Raion
Volhynian Governorate